The anal pore or cytoproct is a structure in various single-celled eukaryotes where waste is ejected after the nutrients from food have been absorbed into the cytoplasm.

In ciliates, the anal pore (cytopyge) and cytostome are the only regions of the pellicle that are not covered by ridges, cilia or rigid covering.  They serve as analogues of, respectively, the anus and mouth of multicellular organisms.  The cytopyge's thin membrane allows vacuoles to be merged into the cell wall and emptied.

Location 
The anal pore is an exterior opening of microscopic organisms through which undigested food waste, water, or gas are expelled from the body. It is also referred to as a cytoproct.  This structure is found in different unicellular eukaryotes like paramecium organelles. The anal pore is located on the ventral surface, usually in the posterior half of the cell. The anal pore itself is actually a structure made up of two components: piles of fibres, and microtubules.

Function 
Digested nutrients from the vacuole pass into the cytoplasm, making the vacuole shrink and moves to the anal pore, where it ruptures to release the waste content to the environment on the outside of the cell. The cytoproct is used for the excretion of indigestible debris contained in the food vacuoles. In paramecium, the anal pore is a region of pellicle that is not covered by ridges and cilia, and the area has thin pellicles that allow the vacuoles to be merged into the cell surface to be emptied.

Most micro-organisms possess an anal pore for excretion and are usually an opening on the pellicle to eject out indigestible debris. The opening and closing of the cytoproct resemble a reversible ring of tissue fusion occurring between the inner and outer layers located at the aboral end. An anal pore is not a permanently visible structure as it appears at defecation and disappears afterward. In ciliates, the anal cytostomes and cytopyge pore regions are not covered by either ridges or cilia or hard coatings like the other parts of the organism. As a food vacuole approaches the cytoproct region it actually starts to flatten out the surrounding cells, a thin membrane vacuole allows it to be combined in the cell wall. Once the vacuole attaches to the plasma membrane of the cell wall the vacuole is emptied. The waste excreted by the cell can come as a membrane bound packaged ball or as a stream of debris behind the organism. 

Directly after secretion of the waste products, deep invagination (deep canyon like structure that was the vacuole) is still present. Shortly after, about 10-30 seconds after secretion, the vacuole detaches and a new thin plasma membrane is formed. After a minute has gone by the organisms cytoproct is closed up again and the process is ready to be repeated.

In marine animals 

Ctnephores are marine animals superficially resembling jellyfish but having biradial symmetry and swimming by means of eight bands of transverse ciliated plates. All ctenophores possess a pair of small anal pores located adjacent to the apical sensory organ thought to control osmotic pressure. These animals are also with animal pore. They are not quite as ‘simple’ as one might first imagine. Ctenophores which have sometimes been interpreted as homologous with the anus of bilaterian animals (worms, humans, snails, fish, etc.). Furthermore, they possess a third tissue layer between the endoderm and ectoderm, another characteristic reminiscent of the Bilateria. We unequivocally show that ctenophores possess a functional through-gut from which digestion waste products and material distributed via the endodermal canals are expelled to the exterior environment through terminal anal pores that are anatomically physiologically specialized to contro outflow from the branched endodermal canal system. Ctenophores have no true anus; the central canal opens toward the aboral end by two small pores, through which a small amount of egestion can take place. On the right are pictures of ctenophores with anal pores.

References

Cell biology

Bibliography 

 “Introduction to Ctenophora.” Introduction to the Ctenophora, https://ucmp.berkeley.edu/cnidaria/ctenophora.html.
 Magazine R1119 - Home: Cell Press. https://www.cell.com/current-biology/pdf/S0960-9822(08)01291-8.pdf.
 Presnell, Jason S., et al. “The Presence of a Functionally Tripartite through-Gut in Ctenophora Has Implications for Metazoan Character Trait Evolution.” Current Biology, Cell Press, 25 Aug. 2016, https://www.sciencedirect.com/science/article/pii/S0960982216309319#:~:text=Therefore%2C%20in%20ctenophores%2C%20the%20anal,of%20a%20functional%20through%2Dgut.